Statistics of Nemzeti Bajnokság I for the 1908–09 season.

Overview
It was contested by 9 teams, and Ferencvárosi TC won the championship.

League standings

Results

References
Hungary - List of final tables (RSSSF)

1908-09
1908–09 in Hungarian football
1908–09 in European association football leagues